The February 2, 2008 resignation of Republican Richard Baker triggered a special election for Louisiana's 6th district. In anticipation of this election, party qualifying occurred before Baker's resignation. The timeline mirrored that of the 2008 special election for the 1st congressional district. The two elections were the first Louisiana congressional elections not based on Louisiana's jungle primary system since the 1970s.

Democrat Don Cazayoux won the 6th district election, defeating Republican Woody Jenkins by three percentage points, as well as two independent candidates and a member of the Constitution Party. He was sworn in on May 6, switching the party affiliation of the seat. (This was the second time such a party switch occurred due to a special election during the 110th Congress.)

Democratic primary

Candidates
Don Cazayoux, Louisiana State Representative
Michael L. Jackson, Louisiana State Representative
Jason DeCuir — Lawyer and unsuccessful State Senate candidate
Andy Kopplin, former Chief of Staff to Governors Foster and Blanco, former LRA Executive Director
Joe Delatte, electrician

Results

Republican primary

Candidates
Woody Jenkins, former Louisiana State Representative, candidate for the United States Senate in 1996, newspaper editor
Laurinda L. Calongne, lobbyist and owner of Robert Rose Consulting, a government relations firm.
 Michael Cloonan, United States Navy veteran, businessman
 Paul Sawyer, former aide to former Congressman Richard Baker

Results

Constitution Party
Randall T. Hayes, critic of plurality voting, proponent of instant runoff voting

Independent candidates
Peter J. Aranyosi
Ashley Casey, New media consultant, former press secretary to Gov. Buddy Roemer and Congresswoman Sue Kelly

General election

Results

County results

See also 
 Louisiana's 1st congressional district special election, 2008
 List of special elections to the United States House of Representatives
 United States House of Representatives elections in Louisiana, 2008
 Illinois's 14th congressional district special election, 2008
 Mississippi's 1st congressional district special election, 2008

External links 
Don Cazayoux campaign website
Woody Jenkins campaign website
Randall Hayes campaign website
Ashley Casey campaign Website
Jason DeCuir campaign Website
Joe Delatte campaign website
Andy Kopplin campaign website
Laurinda Calongne campaign website
Michael Cloonan campaign website

References

Louisiana 2008 06
Louisiana 2008 06
2008 06 Special
Louisiana 06 Special
United States House of Representatives 06 Special
United States House of Representatives 2008 06
Louisiana 06